Rufus Cappadocia is a Canadian-American cellist best known for his cross-cultural recordings and performances. He has released albums in collaboration with guitarist David Fiuczynski, singer Bethany Yarrow, Stellamara with Sonja Drakulich, multi-instrumentalist Ross Daly and The Paradox Trio with Matt Dariau.

Biography
Cappadocia was born and raised in Hamilton, Ontario. He began playing cello at the age of 3. Cappadocia went on to study classically at McGill University in Montreal, where he spent much of his spare time studying sounds and music from lesser-known musical traditions in the university's ethno-musicology department. He left school, and traveled to the south of France and to Spain, where he played as a street musician. In his travels, be continued to pick up new sounds and ethnic styles, which he blended into his own.

Partly to improve his ability to compete with other street musicians, Cappadocia decided to "add a bass register" to his cello. He left Europe, and is now based in New York. His musical style blends "the similarities between seemingly diverse music forms such as blues, Sufi, Middle Eastern and even Gregorian chant. To him they are all compatible, microtonal modes of music."

Cappadocia's past collaborations have included participation in the jazz group The Paradox Trio and the World Music group Trance Mission. He has also produced CDs with guitarist David Fiuczynski and singer/songwriter Bethany Yarrow.

Discography

Rufus Cappadocia and David Fiuczynski

Rufus and Bethany

Solo releases

References

External links
 Rufus Cappadocia's official website
 Profile of Cappadocia at NPR
 
 TED Talks: Bruno Bowden folds while Rufus Cappadocia plays (TED2008)

Year of birth missing (living people)
Living people
Musicians from Hamilton, Ontario
McGill University School of Music alumni
Canadian cellists
Canadian expatriate musicians in the United States